Alagappa Chettiar Government College of Engineering and Technology (ACGCET-Karaikudi) is an autonomous (with effect from 2009) college of engineering in Karaikudi, Tamil Nadu, India. Established in 1952, it is under the control of the government of the State. The college is a member institute under the TEQIP – Technical Education Quality Improvement Programme in India (7 colleges were selected from Tamil Nadu).

History
R.M. Alagappa Chettiar founded Alagappa Chettiar Educational Trust with the aim of developing the backward area of Karaikudi into a centre for higher education.

On 21 July 1952 ACCET started with three faculties – Civil, Mechanical and Electrical and Electronics Engineering under the University of Madras. The foundation for the main building of the college was laid by Rajendra Prasad, the President of India, on 19 February 1953.

 1966 – The institution was handed over to the government of Tamil Nadu.
 1969 – A new faculty, Electronics and Communication Engineering was started.
 1983 – M.E. in Microwave and Optical Engineering started
 1988 – Master of Computer Application (M.C.A.) started.
 2001 – B.E. Degree course in Computer Science and Engineering introduced.

The institution has been awarded the status of the best engineering college of 2006–07 in Tamil Nadu. Chief Minister M. Karunanidhi honoured the Principal in a function at Anna University, Chennai, on 1 September 2008 for this cause.
The college is now affiliated to Anna University, Chennai from 2012. Amenities like Canteen, PostOffice are available.

Campus facilities

NRSC building
The Non Resident Students Centre Building was declared open on 27 March 1981 for the benefit of day scholars. It houses a couple of spacious dining halls with furniture. A room for the students association and a few guest rooms are also available in the NRSC Building.

Hostel Facility
The college also offers separate hostel facilities for both boys and girls. Hostel blocks are situated around the college campus. In order to avoid ragging problem separate hostels for all years are available with watchman available for the whole day

Sports and games
The college offers facilities for outdoor and indoor games such as cricket, hockey, football, volleyball, basketball, badminton, tennis and table tennis and chess. There is a 400 m track for athletics and the necessary equipment for jumps, throws, power lifting and body building. The membership of the tennis club is open to staff and students of the college. An indoor stadium and gymnasium are also available. To promote sports among the students every year intra-college sports meet is being conducted.

Cooperative store
Alagappa Chettiar College of Engineering and Technology and Alagappa Polytechnic Students Co-operative Society Limited was registered on 19 January 1956. Every student on admission to the college automatically becomes the member of co-operative store. The store primarily caters to the requirements of the students. A co-operative store with students and staff as members is functioning in the campus. A co-operative thrift society is also functioning in the campus for the benefit of the faculty and staff members of the college.

Medical Facilities
A dispensary is functioning in the hostel campus with an attached in-patient ward to accommodate students and staff in case of illness. The unit is under the charge of a part-time medical officer assisted by a pharmacist. The dispensary functions during forenoon session on all weekdays except Sunday.

Auditorium
The college auditorium (Dewan Bahadur Murugappa Hall) is the college auditorium seating a capacity of 600. It also has a spacious stage for conducting cultural programmes and entertainment.

Post office
Alagappa Engineering College Post Office is located in the college campus. You can avail postal services just in a few steps of walking.

Bank
You can avail SBI ATM facility in CECRI . Indian Bank ATM and canara bank ATM facility is also situated near the college campus. ICICI bank along with ATM facility is reachable in a few metres in College Road.

Organisation and administration

Principals
1952–1953 V. S
1953–1962 D. S. 
1962–1964 P. S. Manisundaram
1964–1965 A. V.
1965–1971 W. 
1971–1976 S. Srinivasan
1976–1977 R. Sridhara Rao
1977–1984 N. M. Janardhan
1984–1985 S. Narayanaswamy
1985–1986 M. M. Rahman
1986–1987 T. R. Natesan
1987–1988 S. R. Srinivasan
1988–1991 A. N. Thomas
1991–1993 K. N. Shanmugasundaram
1993–1996 P. Balakrishnan
1996–1998 E. Ramasamy
1999–2000 T. R. Thyagarajan
2000–2005 V. M. Periasamy
2005–2006 R. Lakshmipathy
2006–2009 R. Sundararajan
2009–2011 V. Sekaran
2011–2012 A. Mala
2012 – June 2012 Neelakandan
2012–2013 A.Mala
2013– Feb 2013 Jawahar Pandian
2013– 2016 A.Mala
2016 - Jan 2017 Rajkumar
Feb 2017 – May 2019 Dr.A.Elango
June 2019 – Jun 2020 Dr. R. Shanmugalakshmi
June 2020 -  Malayalamurthi
June 2021- Dr.K.Manonmani
December 2021- Dr.P.K.Palani

Student life

Student associations
To encourage the students in extra curricular activities various associations are functioning in the campus, including fine arts association, Tamil mandram and more.

Lateral entry counseling
The institution is the center for lateral entry admissions every year under Anna University to colleges across Tamil Nadu. Using admissions software developed by its own students, the institute organizes the counseling process (invitation of applications, scrutiny of forms, preparation of merit list, dispatch of call letters and allotment of seats) for direct entry into second year B.E/BTech courses all over the state. The team for admissions functions under the leadership of the Principal, who is the secretary for admissions.

ACCET alumni
The Old Students Association maintains contact between the ex-students of the college and the college itself. It was called as Alagappa Chettiar College of Engineering and Technology Old Boys Association (ACCETOBA) but now it is re-christened as ACCETOSA (Alagappa Chettiar College of Engineering and Technology Old Students Association). To promote the technical skills of the students a project contest called Thirann is conducted in even semesters by the Alumni.

Placements

Many corporate companies visit regularly for campus interview. First time in the history of ACCET 2004–08 batch Civil Engineering students achieved 100% campus placement. The college shows keen interest in students getting exposed to industries. It has signed MoUs with "Flsmidth" and "Caritor" and has vision to extend its relationship with other industries. ECE department of our college has signed MoU with companies like "VI Microsystem", "Enixs", "Ifutura".

See also

 List of Tamil Nadu Government's Educational Institutions
 List of Tamil Nadu Government's Engineering Colleges

References

External links 
 

Engineering colleges in Tamil Nadu
Colleges affiliated to Anna University
Education in Sivaganga district
Educational institutions established in 1952
1952 establishments in Madras State
Academic institutions formerly affiliated with the University of Madras